The men's heptathlon event at the 2003 IAAF World Indoor Championships was held on March 15–16.

Medalists

Results

60 metres

Long jump

Shot put

High jump

60 metres hurdles

Pole vault

1000 metres

Final results

References
Results

Heptathlon
Combined events at the World Athletics Indoor Championships